Aegista inexpectata is a species of air-breathing land snail, a terrestrial pulmonate gastropod mollusk in the family Camaenidae. This species is endemic to Japan.

References

inexpectata
Molluscs of Japan
Gastropods described in 1977
Taxonomy articles created by Polbot